Andrew W. Santino (born October 16, 1983) is an American stand-up comedian, actor, and podcaster known for television series and films such as Sin City Saints, The Disaster Artist, Mixology, I'm Dying Up Here and Dave.

Education
Santino grew up in the River North neighborhood of Chicago, and is of Italian and Irish descent. Raised by a single mother, he lived in Section 8 housing. Santino graduated from Naperville North High School in 2001, and then attended Arizona State University.

Career
On I'm Dying Up Here, he played Bill Hobbs, a talented, popular comedian who sabotages himself with a bitter attitude and negative outlook on life. Currently he stars in the series Dave, which tells the fictionalized story of rapper Lil Dicky. Santino portrays Dave's roommate and manager. In 2017, he released a Showtime special called "Home Field Advantage" 1. He also played a recurring character in the NBC drama This Is Us, a producer of the fictional sitcom The Manny.

Santino produces and hosts a podcast, Whiskey Ginger, where he interviews friends in the entertainment industry as they reflect on their past while sipping whiskey. In 2020, Santino began co-hosting the Bad Friends podcast with Bobby Lee.

Filmography

Film

Stand-up specials

Television

References

External links
 

1983 births
Living people
People from Chicago
American stand-up comedians
American male television actors
American male film actors
Comedians from Illinois
Arizona State University alumni
American podcasters